The Minister for Education and Science is a member of the Cabinet of Ministers of Latvia.

Ministers 

 Kārlis Šadurskis, 11 February 2016 – 27 November 2018
 Jānis Reirs, 27 November 2018 – 23 January 2019 
 Ilga Šuplinska, 23 January 2019 – 3 June 2021
 Anita Muižniece, 3 June 2021 - 14 December 2022
 Anda Čakša, 14 December - Incumbent

References 

 
Education and Science